Huntsville is a city in and county seat of Madison County, Arkansas, United States. The population was 2,879 at the 2020 census, up from 2,346 in 2010. During the American Civil War in 1862, it was the site of what became known as the Huntsville Massacre. Huntsville is part of the Northwest Arkansas region.

History
The city is named after Huntsville, Alabama, the hometown of some early settlers. Huntsville incorporated as a town after the Civil War in 1877. The community was incorporated as a city on July 16, 1925.

Geography
Huntsville is located north of the center of Madison County at  (36.089672, -93.735101), in the northwest part of the Ozarks.

Town Branch flows northward through the east side of the city, ending at Holman Creek in the northern part of the city. Holman Creek flows north into War Eagle Creek, which continues northwest to the White River east of Springdale.

Demographics

2020 census

As of the 2020 United States census, there were 2,879 people, 866 households, and 517 families residing in the city. There were 866 households, out of which 34.6% had children under the age of 18 living with them, 41.1% were married couples living together, 15.8% had a female householder with no husband present, and 35.1% were non-families. 32.5% of all households were made up of individuals, and 20.0% had someone living alone who was 65 years of age or older. The average household size was 2.43 and the average family size was 3.03.

In the city, the population was spread out, with 15.8% under the age of 5, 65.4% from 18 to 64, 12.8% were 65 years of age or older.  The median age was 39 years. For every 100 females, there were 87.8 males.  For every 100 females age 18 and over, there were 82.0 males.

The median income for a household in the city was $34,167, and the median income for a family was $48,952. Males had a median income of $26,929 versus $19,766 for females. The per capita income for the city was $14,686.  About 29.0% of the population were below the poverty line, including 32.1% of those under age 18 and 16.7% of those age 65 or over.

Economy

Education 
The Huntsville School District provides public elementary and secondary education leading to graduation at Huntsville High School.

The Huntsville Public Library, part of the Madison Carroll and Madison Library System, is located at 827 N. College Street, which provides patrons of the library system access to print books, publications, multimedia content, internet access, public computer access, as well as access to an Interlibrary loan system.

Infrastructure

Transportation

Major highways

 U.S. Route 412
 U.S. Route 412 Business
 Highway 23
 Highway 74

Aviation
The Huntsville Municipal Airport is a city-owned, public-use airport located two nautical miles (4 km) southwest of Huntsville's central business district.

Notable people

 Joe Berry, Major League Baseball pitcher for the Chicago Cubs, Philadelphia Athletics, and Cleveland Indians
 Orval E. Faubus, 36th governor of Arkansas during the desegregation days; lived in Huntsville as a youth, having been born in the nearby Combs community
 Ronnie Hawkins, legendary rockabilly musician; his band The Hawks later became The Band; born in Huntsville
 Gary Miller, Republican congressman from California; born in Huntsville
 Isaac Murphy, politician who lived and worked in Huntsville; elected as governor in 1863 after Union occupation of Little Rock 
 Danny L. Patrick, Republican member of the Arkansas House of Representatives from Madison and Carroll counties from 1967 to 1970; taught school in Huntsville from 1964 to 1971

References

External links
 
 
 City-Data.com, comprehensive statistical data and more about Huntsville

Cities in Madison County, Arkansas
Cities in Arkansas
County seats in Arkansas
Northwest Arkansas
Populated places established in 1925